Robert Townsend (born February 6, 1957) is an American actor, director, comedian, and writer. Townsend is best known for directing the films Hollywood Shuffle (1987), Eddie Murphy Raw (1987), The Meteor Man (1993), The Five Heartbeats (1991) and various other films and stand-up specials. He is especially known for his eponymous self-titled character, Robert Peterson as the starring role as on The WB sitcom The Parent 'Hood (1995–1999), a series which he created and of which directed select episodes. Townsend is also known for his role as Donald "Duck" Matthews in his 1991 film The Five Heartbeats. He later wrote, directed and produced Making The Five Heartbeats (2018), a documentary film about the production process and behind the scenes insight into creating the film. Townsend is also known for his production company Townsend Entertainment which has produced films Playin' for Love, In the Hive and more. During the 1980s and early–1990s, Townsend gained national exposure through his stand-up comedy routines and appearances on The Tonight Show Starring Johnny Carson. Townsend has worked with talent including Halle Berry, Morgan Freeman, Chris Tucker, Beyoncé, Denzel Washington and many more.

Early life and career
Townsend was born in Chicago, the second of four children to Shirley (née Jenkins) and Ed Townsend. His mother ended up raising him and his three siblings as a single parent. Growing up on the city's west side, Townsend attended Austin High School; graduating in 1975. He became interested in acting as a teenager. During a reading of Sophocles' Oedipus Rex in high school, Townsend captured the attention of Chicago’s X Bag Theatre, The Experimental Black Actors Guild. Townsend later auditioned for parts at Chicago's Experimental Black Actors' Guild and performed in local plays studying at the famed Second City comedy workshop for improvisation in 1974. Townsend had a brief uncredited role in the 1975 movie Cooley High, but says the film "changed his life" for what he perceived as its true-to-life portrayal of people like him.

After high school, Townsend enrolled at Illinois State University, studied a year and later moved to New York to study at the Negro Ensemble Company. Townsend's mother believed that he should complete his college education, but he felt that college took time away from his passion for acting, and he soon dropped out of school to pursue his acting career full-time.

Career
Townsend auditioned to be part of Saturday Night Live'''s 1980–1981 cast, but was rejected in favor of Eddie Murphy. In 1982, Townsend appeared as one of the main characters in the PBS series Another Page, produced by Kentucky Educational Television that taught literacy to adults through serialized stories. Townsend later appeared in small parts in films like A Soldier's Story (1984), directed by Norman Jewison, and after its success garnered much more substantial parts in films like The Mighty Quinn (1989) with Denzel Washington.

In 1987, Townsend wrote, directed and produced Hollywood Shuffle, a satire based on the hardships and obstacles that black actors undergo in the film industry. The success of his first project helped him establish himself in the industry. Another of his films was The Five Heartbeats based on 1960s R&B male groups and the tribulations of the music industry. Townsend created and produced two television variety shows—the CableACE award–winning Robert Townsend and His Partners in Crime for HBO, and the Fox Television variety show Townsend Television (1993). He also created and starred in the WB Network's sitcom The Parent 'Hood which originally ran from January 1995 to July 1999. In 2018, Townsend also directed 2 episodes for the B.E.T. Series American Soul which began airing in 2019. The show is about Don Cornelius and Soul Train. Townsend was programming director at the Black Family Channel, but the network folded in 2007. Townsend created The Robert Townsend Foundation, a nonprofit organization whose mission is to introduce and help new unsigned filmmakers.

Awards and other credits
Townsend directed the 2001 TV movie, Livin' for Love: The Natalie Cole Story for which Cole won the NAACP Image Award as Outstanding Actress in a Television Movie, Mini-Series or Dramatic Special. Townsend also directed two television movies in 2001 and 2002 respectively, Carmen: A Hip Hopera and 10,000 Black Men Named George. In 2013 Townsend was nominated for an Ovation Award in the category of "Lead Actor in a Musical" for his role as Dan in the La Mirada Theatre for the Performing Arts production of Next to Normal.

Personal life
Townsend was married to Cheri Jones from September 15, 1990, to August 9, 2001. Together they had two daughters, Sierra and Skye, both entertainers, and a son, Isiah.

Filmography

References

Further reading
 
 
Rogers, Brent. "Robert Townsend Article in Perspectives". Sustaining Digital History''. 12 November 2007.

External links

1957 births
Living people
American male film actors
American male television actors
African-American male actors
Male actors from Chicago
African-American film directors
Film directors from Illinois
American television directors
African-American television directors
Film producers from Illinois
African-American television producers
Television producers from Illinois
African-American screenwriters
Screenwriters from Illinois
Comedians from Illinois
20th-century American comedians
21st-century American comedians
USC School of Cinematic Arts faculty
20th-century African-American people
21st-century African-American people